Steven Heller (born July 7, 1950) is an American art director, journalist, critic, author, and editor who specializes in topics related to graphic design.

Biography 
Steven Heller was born July 7, 1950, in New York City to Bernice and Milton Heller. He attended the Walden School, a progressive prep school on the Upper West Side of Manhattan, as well as military school. In 1968, he enrolled at New York University with a major in English, later transferring to the School of Visual Arts illustration and cartoon program but not graduating from either. After leaving SVA, he was hired to teach a newspaper design class.

In 1968, he became the art director of the New York Free Press without formal education or credentials because of his leftist leanings, later attending some New York University lectures utilizing his press pass. He met illustrator Brad Holland who convinced him page layouts and type choices mattered, of which Heller was previously unconcerned. After the Free Press, he moved on to various publications, including porn tabloid Screw.

In 1974, Heller became the youngest art director for The New York Times Op-Ed page, replacing Jean-Claude Suares. His interest in illustration employed on the Op-Ed page led him to publish collections on the subject. He became the art director of The New York Times Book Review in 1977.

In the 1980s, he became interested in design through friendships with Seymour Chwast and Louise Fili, who he later married, as well as becoming the editor of the AIGA Journal of Graphic Design. Under his care, the Journal became a place of critical design writing, inviting authors from a variety of professions and nurturing the careers of fledgling critics, who documented design writing. In 1984, Heller helped create the master’s program for illustration at the School of Visual Arts.

In 2007, he began a transition from his 30-year career at the New York Times. The changes created a lot of stress, and his Parkinson’s was either triggered or exacerbated.

In 2008, Heller co-founded the MFA in design criticism program (D-Crit) with Alice Twemlow. The program was intended to help non-designers find a place in the design field. As of 2019, he serves on the faculty of the School of Visual Arts as co-chair of the MFA Design Department, special assistant to the president, and co-founder of the MFA Design Criticism, MPS Branding, MFA Interaction Design, MFA Products of Design programs. Heller's pupils have included Deborah Adler.

Awards and recognition 
In 1996, he was inducted into the Art Directors Club Hall of Fame. In 1999, Heller received an AIGA Medal for what designer Paula Scher described as "lifetime achievement that comes from a workday existing roughly between 4:30 and 8:45 A.M. before a full workday at the New York Times Book Review." The Society of Illustrators honored Heller with the Richard Gangel Art Director Award in 2005. In 2017, the AIGA named an award, the Steven Heller Prize for Cultural Commentary, in his honor, citing his three decades of contributions to cultural discourse on design. In 2011, was awarded the Design Mind Award by the National Design Museum.

Writing 
Heller has said he writes so that he "can further discover and share what I’ve learned with others" and as a way to study topics he is curious about, notably the emergence of right- and left-wing tyrannies and pre-World War II totalitarianism. The subjects he writes about are seen through the lens of graphic design and are motivated by not being able to sleep and how design manipulates and communicates.

Articles 
Heller is author and co-author of many works on the history of illustration, typography, and many subjects related to graphic design. He has published more than eighty titles and written articles for magazines including Affiche, Baseline, Creation, Design, Design Issues, Design Observer, Eye, Graphis, How, I.D., Oxymoron, Mother Jones, The New York Times Book Review, Print, Speak, and U&lc magazine. For thirty-three years Heller was a senior art director of U&lc magazine, a publication devoted to typography.

Books (partial list) 
Heller has written, co-authored, and/or edited more than 130 books about design and popular culture. He worked with Seymour Chwast to create Push Pin Editions and more than 20 books for Chronicle Books with his wife, Louise Fili.

Innovators of American illustration, Steven Heller. 1986.
Design Culture: An Anthology of Writing from the AIGA Journal of Graphic Design, Marie Finamore, Steven Heller. 1997.
Sourcebook of Visual Ideas, Steven Heller, Seymour Chwast. 1989.
Designing With Illustration, Steven Heller, Karen Pomeroy. 1990.
Borrowed Design: Use and Abuse of Historical Form, Steven Heller, Julie Lasky. 1993.
Italian Art Deco: Graphic Design Between the Wars, Steven Heller, Louise Fili. 1993.
Streamline: American Art Deco Graphic Design, Steven Heller, Louise Fili. 1995.
Japanese Modern: Graphic Design Between the Wars, James Fraser, Steven Heller, Seymour Chwast. 1996.
 Design Literacy (Continued): Understanding Graphic Design, Steven Heller. 1999.
 Paul Rand, Steven Heller, Paul Rand, Jessica Helfand. 1999
 Anatomy of Design: Uncovering the Influences and Inspiration in Modern Graphic Design, Steven Heller, Mirko Ilic. 1999.
 Typology: Type Design from the Victorian Era to the Digital Age, Steven Heller, Louise Fili. 1999.
 British Modern: Graphic Design Between the Wars, Steven Heller, Louise Fili. 2001.
Red Scared!: The Commie Menace in Propaganda and Popular Culture, Michael Barson, Steven Heller. 2001.
This Way - That Way: Prints + Posters Exhibitions + Environments, Keith Godard, Edwin Schlossberg, Steven Heller. 2001.
 Design Humor: The Art of Graphic Wit, Steven Heller. 2002.
Citizen Designer: Perspectives on Design Responsibility, Steven Heller, Veronique Vienne. 2003.
 Teaching Graphic Design: Course Offerings and Class Projects from the Leading Graduate and Undergraduate Programs, Steven Heller. 2003.
 Design Literacy: Understanding Graphic Design, Steven Heller. 2004.
Inside the Business of Illustration, Steven Heller, Marshall Arisman. 2004.
Times Square Style: Graphics from the Great White Way, Vicki Gold Levi, Steven Heller. 2004.
Euro Deco: Graphic Design Between the Wars, Steven Heller, Louise Fili. 2005.
Nigel Holmes: On Information Design, Steven Heller, Nigel Holmes. 2006.
 Stylepedia: A Guide to Graphic Design Mannerisms, Quirks, and Conceits, Steven Heller, Louise Fili. 2006.
 Design Disasters: Great Designers, Fabulous Failure, and Lessons Learned, Steven Heller. 2008.
 Design Entrepreneur: Turning Graphic Design Into Goods That Sell, Steven Heller, Lita Talarico. 2008.
 Design School Confidential: Extraordinary Class Projects From the International Design Schools, Colleges, and Institutes, Steven Heller, Lita Talarico. 2009.
 Becoming a Graphic Designer: A Guide to Careers in Design, Steven Heller, Teresa Fernandes. 2010.
The Swastika: Symbol Beyond Redemption?, Steven Heller. 2010.
 Becoming a Digital Designer: A Guide to Careers in Web, Video, Broadcast, Game and Animation Design, Steven Heller, David Womack. 2011.
 Design School: Extraordinary Class Projects From International Design Schools, Steven Heller, Lita Talarico. 2011.
 Graphic Design Reader, Steven Heller. 2012.
 Stop, Think, Go, Do: How Typography and Graphic Design Influence Behavior, Steven Heller, Mirko Ilic. 2012.
Design Firms Open for Business, Steven Heller, Lita Talarico. 2013.
Lettering Large: Art and Design of Monumental Typography, Steven Heller, Mirko Ilić. 2013.
Writing and Research for Graphic Designers: A Designer's Manual to Strategic Communication and Presentation, Steven Heller. 2013.
 Becoming a Graphic and Digital Designer: A Guide to Careers in Design, Steven Heller, Veronique Vienne. 2015.
Graphic Style Lab: Develop Your Own Style with 50 Hands-On Exercises, Steven Heller. 2015.
Becoming a Design Entrepreneur: How to Launch Your Design-Driven Ventures from Apps to Zines, Lita Talarico, Steven Heller. 2016.
Graphic Design Rants and Raves: Bon Mots on Persuasion, Entertainment, Education, Culture, and Practice, Steven Heller. 2017.
The Design of Dissent, Expanded Edition: Greed, Nationalism, Alternative Facts, and the Resistance, Milton Glaser, Mirko Ilic, Tony Kushner, Steven Heller. 2017.
 The Moderns: Midcentury American Graphic Design, Steven Heller, Greg D'Onofrio. 2017.
100 Ideas that Changed Graphic Design, Steven Heller, Veronique Vienne. 2019.
 Teaching Graphic Design History, Steven Heller. 2019.
 Growing Up Underground: A Memoir of Counterculture New York, Steven Heller. 2022.

Exhibitions (as curator)

The Art of Simplicisimus (The Goethe House)
The Malik Verlag (The Goethe House)
Political Art: Ten Years of Graphic Commentary (AIGA)
L'Assiette au Beurre (The French Institute)
Cartoonists for a Nuclear Freeze (Marymount College)
The Art of Satire (Pratt Graphic Center)
Graphic Jesters: Two Generations (Schiller Wapner Gallery)
Art Against War (Parsons School of Design)
Typographic Treasures: The Work of W.A. Dwiggins (ITC Gallery)
Push Pin Studio Retrospecitive (Cooper Union)

See also
 First Things First 2000 manifesto
 Emigre Issue 51: First Things First, 1999.
Steven Heller Logo Geek Interview: A Brief History of Logo Design. 2019

References

External links
 Steve Heller, Typo2007 Keynote (video): »Das Auge hört mit«
 Steve Heller, Typo2008 Keynote (video): »Iron graphics: Branding totalitarian states«

1950 births
AIGA medalists
American art critics
American art historians
American art curators
American graphic designers
Design writers
Living people
Writers from Cincinnati
Artists from Cincinnati
School of Visual Arts faculty
The New York Times visual journalists
American male journalists

Jewish American artists
Jewish American historians
Historians from Ohio
21st-century American Jews